Grace is an English surname. Notable people with the surname include:

Alfred Augustus Grace (1867–1942), New Zealand soldier and writer
Arthur Grace (born 1947), American photojournalist and author
Brendan Grace (1951–2019), Irish comedian and singer
C. L. Grace, a pen name of Paul C. Doherty (born 1946), English author, educator, lecturer, and historian
Helen Grace (born 1971), British actress
John Grace (disambiguation), several people
Laura Jane Grace (born 1980), American musician
Maggie Grace (born 1983), American actress
Mark Grace (born 1964), American retired Major League Baseball player
Mckenna Grace (born 2006), American child actress
Michael Grace (disambiguation), several people
Nancy Grace (born 1959), American legal commentator and television journalist
Oliver Grace (fl. 1689), Chief Remembrancer of the Irish Exchequer and Member of Parliament
Ricky Grace (born 1966), American-Australian basketball player
Ted Grace (1931–2020), Australian politician
Thomas Grace (disambiguation), several people
Topher Grace (born 1978), American actor
W. G. Grace (1848–1915), English doctor and cricketer
William Russell Grace (1832–1904), Irish-American politician and founder of W. R. Grace and Company
Willie Grace (1917–2006), American professional baseball player in the Negro leagues

Fictional characters
 Young Mr Grace and Old Mr Grace, owners of Grace Brothers (Are You Being Served?)
 Thalia Grace from Percy Jackson & the Olympians by Rick Riordan
 Jason Grace from the Heroes of Olympus by Rick Riordan
 Jue Viole Grace from Tower of God by Lee Jong-hui 
Jared, Simon and Mallory Grace from The Spiderwick Chronicles by Holly Black and Tony DiTerlizzi

Joshua grace

English-language surnames